The list of ship launches in 1738 includes a chronological list of some ships launched in 1738.


References

1738
Ship launches